Abenberg is a town in the Middle Franconian district of Roth, in Bavaria, Germany. It is situated 9 km west of Roth bei Nürnberg and 25 km southwest of Nuremberg.

Subdivisions 
Abenberg has  14 Districts:

Sons and daughters of the town
 John Schopper, 27th abbot of monastery Heilsbronn (1529-1540) 
 Georg Schwarz (1873-1948), politician, (Bavarian People's Party, Center Party), member of  Reichstag and Landtag

References